Bayo is a Local Government Area of Borno State, Nigeria. Its headquarters are in the town Fikayel.
 
It has an area of 956 km and a population of 78,978 at the 2006 census.

The postal code of the area is 603.

It is one of the four LGAs that constitute the Biu Emirate, a traditional state located in Borno State, Nigeria.

References

Local Government Areas in Borno State
Populated places in Borno State